Chhoo Mantar is a 1956 Bollywood drama film starring Johnny Walker, Anita Guha and Shyama. It was directed by M. Sadiq under the banner of Sadiq Productions.

Story
Baijnath alias Baiju is a slacker, trouble-maker, unemployed, and a flirt. The villagers rally together and force his father to ask him to leave the village, which Baiju does. Baiju's travels take him to the castle of a king, who has a beautiful daughter named Ratnavali. When he sees Ratnavali, he is smitten by her beauty and falls head over heels in love with her. He parks himself opposite her room, and awaits the time when she will make a presence on the balcony, so that he can get an eyeful of her beautiful self. This enrages the King, and he orders his men to thoroughly beat up Baiju and throw him in the sea, which they do. But Baiju survives, recovers, and gets back to wooing the beautiful Ratnavali. This time the King challenges Baiju to accumulate ten lakh rupees in three months, and he will then give his consent to marrying Ratnavali. The King further adds that if Baiju fails, he will be hanged. Baiju accepts the challenge, and brags that he can accumulate not ten lakhs, but fifteen lakhs within that time period. With no survival nor job skills, and no one to even loan him the fifteen lakh rupees, how is Baiju going to escape from the death-trap that the King has prepared for him?

Cast
 Johnny Walker as Baijnath "Baiju"
 Anita Guha as Princess Ratnavali
 Shyama as Sanwali
 Gajanan Jagirdar
 Raj Mehra 
 Sheela Kashmiri

Soundtrack

References

External links

1956 films
1950s Hindi-language films
Films scored by O. P. Nayyar
Indian drama films
Films directed by M. Sadiq
1956 drama films